Trichopodus cantoris is a species of gourami native to Asia. This taxon is treated as a synonym of Trichopodus trichopterus by some authorities.

Etymology 
The species was named after Dr. Cantor as the type came from his collection.

Description 
The two black spots on the body of Trichopodus cantoris are united by a longitudinal zigzag band running from the mouth through the eye to the caudal fin. The caudal fin is white-spotted, and the height of the body is two-fifths or three-sevenths of the SL.

Distribution 
The type specimen of Trichopodus cantoris came from Penang, Malaysia. The distribution of the species is likely to be throughout the Malay Peninsula.

See also 
 Trichopodus pectoralis

References 

 

cantoris
Fish described in 1861
Taxa named by Albert Günther